Dizaj-e Reza Qoli Beyg (also Romanized as Dīzaj-e Rez̤ā Qolī Beyg; also known as ‘Alī Qolī Beyg, Dīzaj, and Dīzaj-e ‘Alīqolī Beyg) is a village in Kuhsar Rural District, in the Central District of Hashtrud County, East Azerbaijan Province, Iran. At the 2006 census, its population was 875, in 212 families.

References 

Towns and villages in Hashtrud County